Pratighaat is a 1987 Hindi feminist drama film directed by N. Chandra, starring Sujata Mehta as lead. It was a remake of the Telugu film Pratighatana (1985), directed by T. Krishna, with Vijayshanti as the lead.

Made on a low-budget, and no big stars, it went on to become a hit, making Rs. 8 crore at the box office. It became part of the hat-trick of hit films by N. Chandra, Ankush (1986), Pratighaat and Tezaab (1988).

Plot 
The film deals with politics-criminal nexus and a college lecturer who takes them on, even after she faces public disrobing. She finally takes law in her hand to take revenge of her insult.

Cast 
 Sujata Mehta as Laxmi S. Joshi
 Arvind Kumar as Advocate Satyaprakash Joshi
 Charan Raj as Kali Prasad
 Rohini Hattangadi as Durga
 Gyan Shivpuri as Durga's Husband
 Mohan Bhandari as Police Inspector Ajay Srivastav
 Ashok Saraf as Lawyer, assistant to Kali
 Nana Patekar as Ex-Constable Karamveer
 Subbiraj as Laxmi's father
 Usha Nadkarni as Laxmi's mother-in-Law
 Kota Srinivasa Rao
 Ravi Patwardhan

Music 
Lyrics: Ravindra Jain

"Tere Sar Pe Mere" – S. Janaki, S. P. Balasubrahmanyam
"Hamre Balma Beimaan" – S.P. Balasubramaniam
"Likhungi Mahabharat Naya" – S. Janaki
"Sara Nagar Aap Hi Ke Saath Hai" – Sushil Kumar, Mohammed Aziz

References

External links 
 

1980s Hindi-language films
Indian feminist films
Violence against women in India
Indian courtroom films
Indian crime drama films
1987 crime drama films
1987 films
Films about women in India
Social realism in film
Films directed by N. Chandra
Films scored by Ravindra Jain
Hindi remakes of Telugu films